William Grant may refer to:

Politicians
Sir William Grant (Master of the Rolls) (1752–1832), Member of the Parliament, 1790–1812; Master of the Rolls, 1801–1817
William Grant (Northern Ireland politician) (1883–1949), Unionist M.P. for the Northern Ireland House of Commons
William Grant (seigneur) (1744–1805), Scottish-born businessman, seigneur and political figure in Lower Canada
William Grant, Lord Grant (1909–1972), Scottish Unionist politician and judge
William Grant, Lord Prestongrange (1701–1764), Scottish politician and judge
William M. Grant (1868–1931), politician in Saskatchewan, Canada

Sportsmen
William St Clair Grant (1894–1918), Scottish rugby player
William Grant (footballer) (1905–1994), English footballer, played for Blackpool F.C.
Bill Grant (Australian footballer), former Australian rules footballer

Military
Sir William Keir Grant (1772–1852), British Army general
Sir William Lowther Grant (1864–1928), Royal Navy officer
William Grant (general) (1870–1939), Australian Army colonel and temporary Brigadier General in World War I

Others
William Grant (businessman) (1839–1923), founder of the company William Grant & Sons, which distils Scotch whisky and other spirits
William Grant (fur trader) (1743–1810), Scottish-born fur trader in Lower Canada
St. William Grant (1894–1977), Jamaican trade unionist and activist
William Grant (New Zealand) (1843–1910), New Zealand shepherd, stock dealer, landowner
William Grant Naboré, American classical pianist
William F. Grant (born 1924), Canadian plant geneticist, biosystematist, educator, and environmental advocate
William Thomas Grant (1876–1972), American philanthropist and founder of the W. T. Grant stores
William James Grant (1829–1866), English painter
William Grant (priest), Archdeacon then Dean of Tuam
William Grant (journalist), see Fred M. Hechinger Grand Prize for Distinguished Education Reporting
William K. Grant, American diplomat

See also
Will Grant (born 1954), American football player
Bill Grant (disambiguation)